Hrant Tokhatyan (born 10 January 1958) is an Armenian actor, comedian, announcer, and producer. Tokhatyan studied at the Yerevan State Institute of Foreign Languages from 1976 to 1981.

Family
Hrant Tokhatyan was born in the family of first class motor mechanic Aram Tokhatyan and forest management engineer Yevgenia Tokhatyan. Tokhatyan has two sons from previous marriages and a daughter in his current marriage with Chamber Theater actress Louisa Nersisyan.

Career 
In 1976, Tokhatyan received an invitation from the Chamber Theater, where he worked for 15 years. In 1991, together with Ruben Jaghinyan and Karen Ghazaryan he founded “Sharm” Holding LLC, where he appears as a director up to the present day. Currently, Hrant Tokhatyan is actively engaged in cinema, as well as theater performances, cooperating with a number of Armenian, Russian and foreign directors, producers, theater personalities and film studios. Tokhatyan is busy not only in his homeland, but also in the Russian Federation. Simultaneously, Tokhatyan participates in philanthropic and patriotic projects, among which are the large-scaled campaign of the charity foundation “Donate life” (at the head of the RA first lady Rita Sargsyan), annual fundraising marathon, organized by “Hayastan” All-Armenian Fund, as well as road construction works in cooperation with Hayk Marutyan and Vazgen Asatryan in the near-border village Haterk in Martakert region of Artsakh, etc. Hrant Tokhatyan is also a member of Council of Elders of Yerevan from the Republican Party, being actively engaged in the country’s social life, and appearing as a member of the initiative aimed at the preservation of buildings and constructions in Yerevan. Establishment of a children’s theater is Tokhatyan’s primary objective.

Awards 
Medals and Awards that were granted to him are:

 Winner of the World Festival of Youth and Students (1985) 
 Laureate of Lenin Komsomol of the first degree (1989) 
 Winner of the second degree in the international theater festival Le Theatre De Monde (1989) 
 Honorary Diploma of the President of the Nagorno Karabakh Republic.
 Certificate of Merit of the Minister of Defense of the Nagorno-Karabakh Republic, 2002.
 Honored Artist of Armenia (2006)
 Honorary Diploma of the Egyptian Children's Festival entertaining films of 2006.
 Medal Andranik Ozanian (Ministry of Defence of Armenia, 2008) 
 Vazgen Sargsyan Medal (Ministry of Defence of Armenia, 2010)
 World Armenian Entertainment Awards Most Demanded Artist Award (2015)

Filmography

References

External links

Armenian male television actors
Armenian comedians
1958 births
Living people
20th-century Armenian male actors
Male actors from Yerevan
Armenian male film actors